Heinrich Gerber may refer to:
 Heinrich Gerber (architect)
 Heinrich Gerber (civil engineer)